Victor Laurence August Christgau (September 20, 1894 – October 10, 1991) was a politician and government official from Minnesota.

Early life
Christgau was born in Dexter Township, Mower County, near Austin, Minnesota. His mother and paternal grandparents were German immigrants. He graduated from the school of agriculture of the University of Minnesota at St. Paul in 1917 and from its college of agriculture in 1923. He engaged in agricultural pursuits. During the First World War he served overseas in the United States Army as a sergeant in the Thirty-third Regiment of Engineers.

Career
He was a member of the Minnesota Senate from 1927 until his resignation in 1929. He was elected as a Republican to the 71st and 72nd US Congresses, (March 4, 1929 – March 3, 1933) and was an unsuccessful candidate for renomination in 1932.

He resumed agricultural pursuits and was appointed executive assistant to the director of production, Division of Agricultural Adjustment Administration, in June 1933. He was director of the Production Division and assistant administrator from January 1934 through February 1935. He was appointed state administrator of the Minnesota Works Progress Administration in June 1935 and served until June 1938.

From 1939 through 1954 Christgau was state director of the Minnesota division of employment and security at St. Paul. He then served as president of the Interstate Conference Employment Security Agencies from 1947 to 1948; Director, Bureau of Old Age and Survivors Insurance, Social Security Administration, from 1954 to 1963, and executive director of Social Security Administration from January, 1963 to March, 1967.

He was a resident of Washington, D.C. until his death there on October 10, 1991.

References

External links 
Minnesota Legislators Past and Present

Victor Christgau: An Inventory of His Papers at the Minnesota Historical Society

|-

1894 births
1991 deaths
Republican Party Minnesota state senators
American Lutherans
American people of German descent
University of Minnesota College of Food, Agricultural and Natural Resource Sciences alumni
People from Mower County, Minnesota
Farmers from Minnesota
Military personnel from Minnesota
United States Army personnel of World War I
Republican Party members of the United States House of Representatives from Minnesota
20th-century American politicians
20th-century Lutherans